The Battle of Simbach on May 9, 1743, was a battle in the War of Austrian Succession near Simbach am Inn. It ended with a heavy defeat of the Bavarian troops against the Austrians.

Aftermath 
Altogether the loss of dead and captured Bavarians, Palatines and Hessians amounted to about 4,000 men, the Austrians only lost a little over a hundred men. Simbach was completely destroyed except for one house, and the surrounding area was also devastated. Braunau had to be handed over on July 4. Soon after, the French-occupied towns of Dingolfing, Landau and Deggendorf were also taken by the Austrians.

References 

1743 in military history
War of the Austrian Succession
History of Bavaria